The Ozark Music Festival was held July 19–21, 1974 on the Missouri State Fairgrounds in Sedalia, Missouri. Today.com estimates that the crowd count reached 160,000 people. The festival was marked by mismanagement as the facilities were not equipped for the number of attendees.

Promotion
A company called Musical Productions Inc. (MPI) from Kansas City promoted the festival, and assured officials from the Missouri Department of Agriculture (the state agency which oversaw the State Fair) and the Sedalia Chamber of Commerce that the three-day weekend event would be a bluegrass and “pop rock” festival with no more than 50,000 tickets sold.

Even though the festival was not scheduled to start until Friday, July 19, thousands had arrived by Thursday night and there was a steady line of vehicles created a traffic jam that was 17 miles long.

Performers

The bands that performed included:

Bachman–Turner Overdrive
Aerosmith
Premiata Forneria Marconi
Peter Sinfield
Blue Öyster Cult
Eagles
America
Marshall Tucker Band
The Nitty Gritty Dirt Band
Boz Scaggs
Ted Nugent and the Amboy Dukes
David Bromberg
Leo Kottke
Jeff Beck
Lynyrd Skynyrd
The Electric Flag
Bruce Springsteen (did not perform)
The Earl Scruggs Revue
Charlie Daniels Band 
Joe Walsh and Barnstorm
The Souther-Hillman-Furay Band
The Ozark Mountain Daredevils
Jimmie Spheeris
Triphammer 
Bill Quateman
Fresh Start 
Babe Ruth
Locomotiv GT
The Sweet
Shawn Phillips
REO Speedwagon
Bob Seger
Banco
Elvin Bishop
Host/Emcee Wolfman Jack

Aftermath
A nearby farmer stated that two of his cattle and several hogs were killed and cooked for food. The portable toilets were turned over and emptied after they were quickly filled up.

By Monday, July 22, the festival crowd had left, leaving a field of garbage behind. Damage estimates of $100,000 were reported, as well as one death and over 1,000 drug overdoses.  

After the festival the city of Sedalia only had a few weeks to clean up for the Missouri State fair, so helicopters were used for spraying lime over the fairgrounds as a precaution against the possible outbreak of disease.

On the ground, bulldozers scraped up the topsoil, which was (reportedly) littered with discarded drug paraphernalia and gnawed cobs of corn from a neighboring field along with mountains of contaminated dirt and garbage which were hauled to the county landfills.

Meanwhile, festival-goers crowded the Interstate 70 rest stops to catch up on sleep lost during the weekend. Tents, cots and sleeping bags were spread throughout rest stops all along the highway.

In early September of that year, the city council banned future rock concerts in the city.

Senate Committee report
The Missouri Senate met in October 1974 and discussed the events of the music festival in the committee report. The report states that, "The Ozark Music Festival can only be described as a disaster. It became a haven for drug pushers who were attracted from throughout the United States. The scene made the degradation of Sodom and Gomorrah appear mild. Natural and unnatural sex acts became a spectator sport. Frequently, nude women promoted drugs with advertisements on their bodies."

See also

List of historic rock festivals
List of jam band music festivals

References

Other sources

	Report of the Select Senate Committee investigating the Rock Festival, October 25, 1974 at Internet Archive.
Senate Select Committee on the Rock Festival (held at Sedalia State Fairgrounds, July 18-22, 1974). Transcript of proceedings.

Sedalia, Missouri
Music festivals in Missouri
1974 in Missouri
1974 establishments in Missouri
Rock festivals in the United States
Music festivals established in 1974
Pop music festivals in the United States